Harriet Elisabeth Beecher Stowe (June 14, 1811 – July 1, 1896) was an American author and abolitionist. She came from the religious Beecher family and became best known for her novel Uncle Tom's Cabin (1852), which depicts the harsh conditions experienced by enslaved African Americans. The book reached an audience of millions as a novel and play, and became influential in the United States and in Great Britain, energizing anti-slavery forces in the American North, while provoking widespread anger in the South. Stowe wrote 30 books, including novels, three travel memoirs, and collections of articles and letters. She was influential both for her writings and for her public stances and debates on social issues of the day.

Life and work
Harriet Elisabeth Beecher was born in Litchfield, Connecticut on June 14, 1811. She was the sixth of 11 children born to outspoken Calvinist preacher Lyman Beecher. Her mother was his first wife, Roxana (Foote), a deeply religious woman who died when Stowe was only five years old. Roxana's maternal grandfather was General Andrew Ward of the Revolutionary War. Harriet's siblings included a sister, Catharine Beecher, who became an educator and author, as well as brothers who became ministers: including Henry Ward Beecher, who became a famous preacher and abolitionist, Charles Beecher, and Edward Beecher.

Harriet enrolled in the Hartford Female Seminary run by her older sister Catharine, where she received a traditional academic education — rather uncommon for women at the time —, with a focus in the Classics, languages, and mathematics. Among her classmates was Sarah P. Willis, who later wrote under the pseudonym Fanny Fern.

In 1832, at the age of 21, Harriet Beecher moved to Cincinnati, Ohio to join her father, who had become the president of Lane Theological Seminary. There, she also joined the Semi-Colon Club, a literary salon and social club whose members included the Beecher sisters, Caroline Lee Hentz, Salmon P. Chase (future governor of Ohio and Secretary of the Treasury under President Lincoln), Emily Blackwell and others. Cincinnati's trade and shipping business on the Ohio River was booming, drawing numerous migrants from different parts of the country, including many escaped slaves, bounty hunters seeking them, and Irish immigrants who worked on the state's canals and railroads. In 1829 the ethnic Irish attacked blacks, wrecking areas of the city, trying to push out these competitors for jobs. Beecher met a number of African Americans who had suffered in those attacks, and their experience contributed to her later writing about slavery. Riots took place again in 1836 and 1841, driven also by native-born anti-abolitionists.

Harriet was also influenced by the Lane Debates on Slavery. The biggest event ever to take place at Lane, it was the series of debates held on 18 days in February 1834, between colonization and abolition defenders, decisively won by Theodore Weld and other abolitionists. Elisabeth attended most of the debates. Her father and the trustees, afraid of more violence from anti-abolitionist whites, prohibited any further discussions of the topic. The result was a mass exodus of the Lane students, together with a supportive trustee and a professor, who moved as a group to the new Oberlin Collegiate Institute after its trustees agreed, by a close and acrimonious vote, to accept students regardless of "race", and to allow discussions of any topic.

It was in the literary club at Lane that she met Rev. Calvin Ellis Stowe, a widower who was a professor of Biblical Literature at the seminary. The two married at the Seminary on January 6, 1836. The Stowes had seven children together, including twin daughters.

Uncle Tom's Cabin and Civil War

In 1850, Congress passed the Fugitive Slave Law, prohibiting assistance to fugitives and strengthening sanctions even in free states. At the time, Stowe had moved with her family to Brunswick, Maine, where her husband was now teaching at Bowdoin College. Their home near the campus is protected as a National Historic Landmark. The Stowes were ardent critics of slavery and supported the Underground Railroad, temporarily housing several fugitive slaves in their home. One fugitive from slavery, John Andrew Jackson, wrote of hiding with Stowe in her house in Brunswick as he fled to Canada in his narrative titled "The Experience of a Slave in South Carolina" (London: Passmore & Albaster, 1862).

Stowe claimed to have a vision of a dying slave during a communion service at Brunswick's First Parish Church, which inspired her to write his story. However, what more likely allowed her to empathize with slaves was the loss of her eighteen-month-old son, Samuel Charles Stowe. She even stated the following, "Having experienced losing someone so close to me, I can sympathize with all the poor, powerless slaves at the unjust auctions. You will always be in my heart Samuel Charles Stowe." On March 9, 1850, Stowe wrote to Gamaliel Bailey, editor of the weekly anti-slavery journal The National Era, that she planned to write a story about the problem of slavery: "I feel now that the time is come when even a woman or a child who can speak a word for freedom and humanity is bound to speak... I hope every woman who can write will not be silent."

Shortly after in June 1851, when she was 40, the first installment of Uncle Tom's Cabin was published in serial form in the newspaper The National Era. She originally used the subtitle "The Man That Was a Thing", but it was soon changed to "Life Among the Lowly". Installments were published weekly from June 5, 1851, to April 1, 1852. For the newspaper serialization of her novel, Stowe was paid $400. Uncle Tom's Cabin was published in book form on March 20, 1852, by John P. Jewett with an initial print run of 5,000 copies. Each of its two volumes included three illustrations and a title-page designed by Hammatt Billings. In less than a year, the book sold an unprecedented 300,000 copies. By December, as sales began to wane, Jewett issued an inexpensive edition at 37½ cents each to stimulate sales. Sales abroad, as in Britain where the book was a great success, earned Stowe nothing as there was no international copyright agreement in place during that era. In late 1853 Stowe undertook a lecture tour of Britain and, to make up the royalties that she could not receive there, the Glasgow New Association for the Abolition of Slavery set up Uncle Tom's Offering.

According to Daniel R. Vollaro, the goal of the book was to educate Northerners on the realistic horrors of the things that were happening in the South. The other purpose was to try to make people in the South feel more empathetic towards the people they were forcing into slavery.
The book's emotional portrayal of the effects of slavery on individuals captured the nation's attention. Stowe showed that slavery touched all of society, beyond the people directly involved as masters, traders and slaves. Her novel added to the debate about abolition and slavery, and aroused opposition in the South. In the South, Stowe was depicted as out of touch, arrogant, and guilty of slander. Within a year, 300 babies in Boston alone were named Eva (one of the book's characters), and a play based on the book opened in New York in November. Southerners quickly responded with numerous works of what are now called anti-Tom novels, seeking to portray Southern society and slavery in more positive terms. Many of these were bestsellers, although none matched the popularity of Stowe's work, which set publishing records.

After the start of the Civil War, Stowe traveled to the capital, Washington, D.C., where she met President Abraham Lincoln on November 25, 1862. Stowe's daughter, Hattie, reported, "It was a very droll time that we had at the White house I assure you... I will only say now that it was all very funny—and we were ready to explode with laughter all the while." What Lincoln said is a minor mystery. Her son later reported that Lincoln greeted her by saying, "so you are the little woman who wrote the book that started this great war." Her own accounts are vague, including the letter reporting the meeting to her husband: "I had a real funny interview with the President."

Later years
Stowe purchased property near Jacksonville, Florida. In response to a newspaper article in 1873, she wrote, "I came to Florida the year after the war and held property in Duval County ever since. In all this time I have not received even an incivility from any native Floridian."

Stowe is controversial for her support of Elizabeth Campbell, Duchess of Argyll, whose father-in-law decades before was a leader in the Highland Clearances, the transformation of the remote Highlands of Scotland from a militia-based society to an agricultural one that supported far fewer people. The newly homeless moved to Canada, where very bitter accounts appeared. It was Stowe's assignment to refute them using evidence the Duchess provided, in Letter XVII Volume 1 of her travel memoir Sunny Memories of Foreign Lands. Stowe was criticized for her seeming defense of the clearances.

In 1868, Stowe became one of the first editors of Hearth and Home magazine, one of several new publications appealing to women; she departed after a year. Stowe campaigned for the expansion of married women's rights, arguing in 1869 that:

In the 1870s, Stowe's brother Henry Ward Beecher was accused of adultery, and became the subject of a national scandal. Unable to bear the public attacks on her brother, Stowe again fled to Florida but asked family members to send her newspaper reports. Through the affair, she remained loyal to her brother and believed he was innocent.

After her return to Connecticut, Mrs. Stowe was among the founders of the Hartford Art School, which later became part of the University of Hartford.

Following the death of her husband, Calvin Stowe, in 1886, Harriet started rapidly to decline in health. By 1888, The Washington Post reported that as a result of dementia the 77-year-old Stowe started writing Uncle Tom's Cabin over again. She imagined that she was engaged in the original composition, and for several hours every day she industriously used pen and paper, inscribing passages of the book almost exactly word for word. This was done unconsciously from memory, the author imagining that she composed the matter as she went along. To her diseased mind the story was brand new, and she frequently exhausted herself with labor which she regarded as freshly created.

Mark Twain, a neighbor of Stowe's in Hartford, recalled her last years in the following passage of his autobiography:
Her mind had decayed, and she was a pathetic figure. She wandered about all the day long in the care of a muscular Irish woman. Among the colonists of our neighborhood the doors always stood open in pleasant weather. Mrs. Stowe entered them at her own free will, and as she was always softly slippered and generally full of animal spirits, she was able to deal in surprises, and she liked to do it.  She would slip up behind a person who was deep in dreams and musings and fetch a war whoop that would jump that person out of his clothes.  And she had other moods.  Sometimes we would hear gentle music in the drawing-room and would find her there at the piano singing ancient and melancholy songs with infinitely touching effect.

Modern researchers now speculate that at the end of her life she was suffering from Alzheimer's disease.

Harriet Beecher Stowe died on July 1, 1896, in Hartford, Connecticut, 17 days after her 85th birthday.
She is buried in the historic cemetery at Phillips Academy in Andover, Massachusetts, along with her husband and their son Henry Ellis.

Legacy

Landmarks
Multiple landmarks are dedicated to the memory of Harriet Beecher Stowe, and are located in several states including Ohio, Florida, Maine and Connecticut.  The locations of these landmarks represent various periods of her life such as her father's house where she grew up, and where she wrote her most famous work.

The Harriet Beecher Stowe House in Cincinnati, Ohio, is the former home of her father Lyman Beecher on the former campus of the Lane Seminary. Her father was a preacher who was greatly affected by the pro-slavery Cincinnati Riots of 1836. Harriet Beecher Stowe lived here until her marriage. It is open to the public and operated as a historical and cultural site, focusing on Harriet Beecher Stowe, the Lane Seminary and the Underground Railroad. The site also presents African-American history.

In the 1870s and 1880s, Stowe and her family wintered in Mandarin, Florida, now a neighborhood of modern consolidated Jacksonville, on the St. Johns River. Stowe wrote Palmetto Leaves while living in Mandarin, arguably an eloquent piece of promotional literature directed at Florida's potential Northern investors at the time. The book was published in 1873 and describes Northeast Florida and its residents. In 1874, Stowe was honored by the governor of Florida as one of several northerners who had helped Florida's growth after the war. In addition to her writings inspiring tourists and settlers to the area, she helped establish a church and a school, and she helped promote oranges as a major state crop through her own orchards. The school she helped establish in 1870 was an integrated school in Mandarin for children and adults. This predated the national movement toward integration by more than a half century. The marker commemorating the Stowe family is located across the street from the former site of their cottage. It is on the property of the Community Club, at the site of a church where Stowe's husband once served as a minister. The Church of our Saviour is an Episcopal Church founded in 1880 by a group of people who had gathered for Bible readings with Professor Calvin E. Stowe and his famous wife. The house was constructed in 1883 which contained the Stowe Memorial stained glass window, created by Louis Comfort Tiffany.

The Harriet Beecher Stowe House in Brunswick, Maine, is where Stowe lived when she wrote Uncle Tom's Cabin. Her husband was teaching theology at nearby Bowdoin College, and she regularly invited students from the college and friends to read and discuss the chapters before publication. Future Civil War general, and later Governor, Joshua Chamberlain was then a student at the college and later described the setting. "On these occasions," Chamberlain noted, "a chosen circle of friends, mostly young, were favored with the freedom of her house, the rallying point being, however, the reading before publication, of the successive chapters of her Uncle Tom's Cabin, and the frank discussion of them." In 2001, Bowdoin College purchased the house, together with a newer attached building, and was able to raise the substantial funds necessary to restore the house. It is now open to the public.

The Harriet Beecher Stowe House in Hartford, Connecticut, is the house where Stowe lived for the last 23 years of her life. It was next door to the house of fellow author Mark Twain. In this  cottage-style house, there are many of Beecher Stowe's original items and items from the time period. In the research library, which is open to the public, there are numerous letters and documents from the Beecher family. The house is open to the public and offers house tours on the hour.

In 1833, during Stowe's time in Cincinnati, the city was afflicted with a serious cholera epidemic. To avoid illness, Stowe made a visit to Washington, Kentucky, a major community of the era just south of Maysville. She stayed with the Marshall Key family, one of whose daughters was a student at Lane Seminary. It is recorded that Mr. Key took her to see a slave auction, as they were frequently held in Maysville. Scholars believe she was strongly moved by the experience. The Marshall Key home still stands in Washington. Key was a prominent Kentuckian; his visitors also included Henry Clay and Daniel Webster.

The Uncle Tom's Cabin Historic Site is part of the restored Dawn Settlement at Dresden, Ontario, which is 20 miles east of Algonac, Michigan. The community for freed slaves founded by the Rev. Josiah Henson and other abolitionists in the 1830s has been restored. There's also a museum. Henson and the Dawn Settlement provided Stowe with the inspiration for Uncle Tom's Cabin.

Honors

 In 1986, Stowe was inducted into the National Women's Hall of Fame.
 On June 13, 2007, the United States Postal Service issued a 75¢ Distinguished Americans series postage stamp in her honor.
 Harris–Stowe State University in St. Louis, Missouri, is named for Stowe and William Torrey Harris.
 In 2010, Stowe was proposed by the Ohio Historical Society as a finalist in a statewide vote for inclusion in Statuary Hall at the United States Capitol (Thomas Edison was chosen instead).

Selected works

Books

Novels
  (First two chapters of serialized version which ran for 40 numbers.) (Digitized version of entire series by University of Virginia.)
  (Published in 2 volumes; stereotyped by Hobart & Robbins.) (One volume 1853 edition is hosted by HathiTrust.)
  (Title from first number.)
  (First English illustrated edition.) (Digital copy hosted by HathiTrust.)
 
 
 
  (Ebook available at Project Gutenberg.)
  (Digital copy hosted by Archive.org)
  (Digitized version at UPenn Digital Library)
  (1871 printing available at Internet Archive.)
  (Ebook available at Project Gutenberg.)
  (Digital copy hosted by HathiTrust.)
  (co-authored with Adeline D.T. Whitney, Lucretia P. Hale, Frederic W. Loring, Frederic B. Perkins and Edward E. Hale.) (Digital copy at Google Books.)
  [1875]. (Sequel to My wife and I.) (Digital copy hosted by HathiTrust.)

Drama
  (Closet drama or reading version based on Uncle Tom's Cabin.) (Digital copy hosted by HathiTrust.)

Poetry
  (Digital copy hosted by Internet Archive.)

Non-fiction
  (As Harriet E. Beecher.)
  [ca. 1845].
  [1849].
  1852?. (Self-published book to raise funds to educate Emily and Mary Edmonson, former slaves redeemed by a public subscription in 1848, supported by Stowe.)
 (Digital Copy hosted by HathiTrust.)
  (Digital copy hosted by HathiTrust: Volume I and Volume II.)
  (Digital copy hosted by HathiTrust.)
  [1865]. (Nimmo's Sixpenny Juvenile Series.) (Digital copy hosted by University of Florida's George A. Smathers Library.)
  (Published under the name of Christopher Crowfield.) (Digital copy hosted by Archive.org.)
  (Published under the name of Christopher Crowfield.) (Digital copy hosted by Archive.org.) 
  (Digital copy hosted by HathiTrust.)
  (Published under the name of Christopher Crowfield.) (Digital copy hosted by HathiTrust.)*  (Written with Catherine Beecher.) (Digitized version at MSU Historic American Cookbook Project.) Textbook version:  (Digital copy hosted by Archive.com.)
  (Digital copy at Archive.org.)
  (Ebook available at Project Gutenberg.)
  (Digital copy is hosted by Archive.org.)
  (Digital copy of 1874 printing is hosted at Archive.org.)
  (Digital copy hosted by HathiTrust.)
  (Digital copy hosted by HathiTrust.)
  [1878]. (Digital copy hosted at Hathi Trust.)
  [published between 1889 and 1883]. (Digital copy of 1901 edition published by Fleming N. Revell hosted by Archive.org.)
  (Collection of children's stories consisting of "A Dog's Mission," "Lulu's Pupil," "The Daisy's First Winter," "Our Charley," "Take Care of the Hook," "A Talk about Birds," "The Nest in the Orchard" AND "The Happy Child".) (Digital copy hosted by HathiTrust.)

Collections

During Stowe's lifetime
  (Consists of the stories: "Love versus Law," "The Tea-rose," "Trials of a Housekeeper," "Little Edward," "Let Every Man Mind His Own Business," "Cousin William," "Uncle Tim," "Aunt Mary," "Frankness," "The Sabbath," "So many Calls," "The Canal-boat," "Feeling," "The Sempstress," "Old Father Morris."(Digital copy hosted by Archive.org.)
  (Consists of the following sketches: "Account of Mrs. Beecher Stowe and her Family," "Uncle Sam's Emancipation," "Earthly Care, A Heavenly Discipline," "A Scholar's Adventure in the Country," "Children," "The Two Bibles," "Letter from Maine, No. 1," "Letter from Maine, No. 2," "Christmas; or, The Good Fairy.") (Digital copy hosted at HathiTrust.)
  (A collection of works consisting of: "The New Year's Gift," "The Bible, The Source of Sure Comfort," "Make to Yourselves Driends," "Earthly Care, A Heavenly Discipline," "So Many Calls," "Learn of Children," "Anti-slavery Meeting in Glasgow, Letter from Mrs. Stowe to Dr Wardlaw.")
  (Published under the name of Christopher Crowfield.) (Digital copy hosted by HathiTrust.) (Consists of the following stories: "The Hen That Hatched Ducks," "The Nutcracker of Nutcracker Lodge," "The History of Tip-Top," "Miss Katy-Did and Miss Cricket," "Mother Magpie's Micschief," "The Squirrels that Live in a House," "Hum, the Son of Buz," "Our Country Neighbors," "Our Dogs," "Dogs and Cats," "Aunt Esther's Rules," "Aunt Esther's Stories," "Sir Walter Scott and his Dogs" and "Country Neighbors Again.")
  (Digital copy hosted by HathiTrust.) (Consists of the stories: "The Ghost in the Mill," "The Sullivan Looking-Glass," "The Minister's Housekeeper," "The Widow's Bandbox," "Captain Kidd's Money," "'Mis' Elderkin's Pitcher'," "The Ghost in the Cap'n Brownhouse.")
  (In addition to the title story, the book includes "Deacon Pitkin's Farm" and "The First Christmas of New England".) (Digital copy hosted by HathiTrust.)
  (Digital copy hosted by HathiTrust.) (Consists of: "The Ghost in the Mill," "The Sullivan Looking-Glass," "The Minister's Housekeeper," "The 2idow's Bandbox," "Captain Kidd's Money," "'Mis' Elderkin's pitcher'," "The Ghost in the Cap'n Brown House," "Colonel Eph's Shoebuckles," "The Bull-Fight," "How to Fight the Devil," "Laughin' in Meetin'," "Tom Toothacre's Ghost Story," "The Parson's Horse-Race," "Oldtown Fireside Talks of the Revolution" and "A Student's Sea Story.") 
  (Digital copy hosted at HathiTrust.)

Notable posthumous collections
  17 Volumes. (A digital copy, hosted by HathiTrust, is linked to each volume number: Vol. I and Vol. II: Uncle Ton's Cabin and A Key to Uncle Tom's Cabin in two volumes; Vol. III & Vol IV: Dread, A Tale of the Great Dismal Swamp and Antislavery Tales and Papers, and Life in Florida After the War; in two volumes Vol. V: The Minister's Wooing; Vol. VI: The Pearl of Orr's Island; Vol. VII: Agnes of Sorento; Vol. VIII: Household Papers and Stories; Vol. IX and Vol. X: Oldtown Folks and Sam Lawson's Oldtown Fireside Stories in two volumes; Vol. XI" Poganuc Peoples and Pink and White Tyranny; Vol. XII: My Wife and I; Vol. XIII: We and Our Neighbors; [Vol. XIV]: Stories, Sketches and Studies: "Uncle Lot," "Love versus Law," "The Tea Rose," "Aunt Mary," "Frankness," "Cousin William," "Mrs. A and Mrs. B; or, What She Thinks about It," "Which is the Liberal Man?" "The Canal Boat," "Feeling," "The Seamstress," "Old Father Morris," "The Coral Ring," "Art and Nature," "The New Year's Gift," "Our Wood Lot in Winter," "The Mourning Veil," "New England Ministers," "Betty's Bright Idea," Deacon Pritkin's Farm, The First Christmas of New England and Little Foxes; Vol. XV: Religious Studies, Sketches and Poems; Vol. XVI: Stories and Sketches for the Young: Queer Little People, Little Pussy Willow, The Minister's Watermelons, A Dog's Mission, Lulu's Pupil and The Daisy's First Winter; [Vol. XVII]: Life and Letters of Harriet Beecher Stowe edited by Annie Field.)
  (Contains Uncle Tom's Cabin, The Minister's Wooing and Oldtown Folks.)

Stories and articles
 
 
 
 
 
 
  and 
 
 
  and 
 
 
 
 
 
  and 
 
 
 
 
 
 
 
 
 
 
 .
 .
 
 
  and 
 
 
 
 
  and 
 
 
 
 
 

See also
 Origins of the American Civil War

Notes

Further reading
 
 
  
 
 
 
 
 Koester, Nancy. Harriet Beecher Stowe: A Spiritual Life (Eerdmans, 2014). pp. xi, 371. 
 
 
 Scott, John Anthony. Woman Againat Slavery: The Story of Harriet Beecher Stowe. New York: Thomas Y. Crowell, 1978. .
 Vollaro, Daniel R., "Lincoln, Stowe, and the 'Little Woman/Great War' Story: The Making, and Breaking, of a Great American Anecdote". Journal of the Abraham Lincoln Association, vol. 30, issue 1 (Winter 2009)

External links

 Harriet Beecher Stowe's Cat Calvin
 
 
 
 
 
 Harriet Beecher Stowe's Uncle Tom's Cabin: an Electronic Edition of the National Era Version –  Edited by textual scholar Wesley Raabe, this is the first edition of the novel to be based on the original text published in the National Era
 Uncle Tom's Cabin and American Culture – A multimedia archive edited by Stephen Railton about the Stowe's novel's place in American history and society
 Harriet Beecher Stowe House & Center – Stowe's adulthood home in Hartford, Connecticut
 Harriet Beecher Stowe Society – Scholarly organization dedicated to the study of the life and works of Harriet Beecher Stowe
 The Online Books Page (University of Pennsylvania)
 
 Harriet Beecher Stowe's brief biography and works
 "Uncle Tom's Cabin: the book that ignited a nation"
 "How To Live on Christ", a pamphlet by Harriet Beecher Stowe, taken from her Introduction to Chistopher Dean's Religion As It Should Be or The Remarkable Experience and Triumphant Death of Ann Thane Peck published in 1847—Hudson Taylor sent a pamphlet using the words of this preface out to all the missionaries of the China Inland Mission in 1869.
 Barron's BookNotes for Uncle Tom's Cabin – The Author and Her Times
 "Writings of Harriet Beecher Stowe" from C-SPAN's American Writers: A Journey Through History
 Letter from Harriet Beecher Stowe to Horace Mann, 2 March 1852 from the Horace Mann Papers III at the Massachusetts Historical Society, retrieved June 4, 2012
 Beecher-Stowe family Papers. Schlesinger Library, Radcliffe Institute, Harvard University.
 The 1849 Cholera Epidemic in Kentucky and Ohio and its connection to Harriet Beecher Stowe's "Uncle Tom's Cabin"
 Michals, Debra "Harriet Beecher Stowe". National Women's History Museum. 2017.
 Stowe family collection from Princeton University Library. Special Collections

1811 births
1896 deaths
American women novelists
American Congregationalists
American people of English descent
Beecher family
University of Hartford people
People from Litchfield, Connecticut
Writers from Hartford, Connecticut
Writers from Brunswick, Maine
19th-century American women writers
19th-century American novelists
Underground Railroad people
The Atlantic (magazine) people
Hall of Fame for Great Americans inductees
Novelists from Connecticut
Novelists from Maine
Congregationalist abolitionists
Christian novelists